Joseph Gerard Trimble (October 12, 1930 – August 11, 2011) was an American pitcher in Major League Baseball who played in seven games over all or part of two seasons for the Boston Red Sox and Pittsburgh Pirates. He was born in Providence, Rhode Island, where he attended La Salle Academy.

Later that year he joined the Cincinnati Reds' organization, spending two full years in the mid-minors before developing a sore arm and drawing his unconditional release. He then missed the 1951–1953 seasons, serving for part of that time in the United States Marines during the Korean War. 

After his discharge from the Marines, Trimble, a free agent, signed with the Pirates' organization. He spent  in the Class B Carolina League, then was selected by the Red Sox in that autumn's Rule 5 draft. He broke camp with Boston as a member of the Red Sox' 28-man early-season roster. In two appearances, both in relief, and two innings of work, he allowed no runs and no hits, although he issued three bases on balls. He fanned one batter, future Baseball Hall of Famer Minnie Miñoso.

Trimble was returned to the Pittsburgh system after his second Bosox appearance, pitching in the Open-Classification Pacific Coast League—then the highest level in minor league baseball—for two seasons with the Hollywood Stars. In , Trimble spent the entire year on the Pirates' MLB roster, although he was sidelined by arm trouble for most of the season. He worked in five games for the Pirates, including four starts, dropping his only two decisions and posting an ineffective 8.24 earned run average, allowing seven home runs in only 19 innings pitched. He ended his pro career after spending 1958 in the Pacific Coast League.

In MLB, Trimble compiled a 0–2 record with a 7.48 ERA in seven total appearances,  giving up 19 runs (one unearned) on 23 hits and 16 walks while striking out ten in 21 innings pitched. 

He returned to Rhode Island after his playing career, working in the soft-drink industry and playing senior amateur hockey into his 50s.

References

External links

Top performances
RIP Joe Trimble, August 17, 2011, Providence Journal

1930 births
2011 deaths
Baseball players from Providence, Rhode Island
Boston Red Sox players
Burlington-Graham Pirates players
Hollywood Stars players
Lockport Reds players
Major League Baseball pitchers
Muskogee Reds players
Pittsburgh Pirates players
Providence Grays players
Salt Lake City Bees players
Tyler Trojans players
United States Marines